Arooj Shah is a British Labour politician and between 2021 and 2022 was the leader of Oldham Metropolitan Borough Council in Greater Manchester. As leader she was also a member of the Greater Manchester Combined Authority and was the combined authority's portfolio lead for Equalities, Inclusion & Cohesion. She was the first Muslim woman to take charge of a council in the north of England.

First elected to the council in 2012, she was the councillor for the Chadderton South ward. She was elected as leader of the council in May 2021 after her predecessor Sean Fielding lost his seat in that year's election. Shah lost her seat in 2022 being beaten by Robert Barnes the Conservative candidate.

Arson attack 
Less than two months after her election as leader, in the early hours of the night of the 13 July 2021, Shah's car was deliberately set alight in what Greater Manchester Police described as a "reckless, abhorrent act". The car and neighbouring property were damaged but nobody was injured as a result of the attack.

Relationship with Dale Cregan's getaway driver 
Shah's relationship with Mohammed Imran Ali (known locally as "Irish Imy") has been the subject of much speculation and criticism. Ali is a convicted heroin trafficker that has been in and out of prison for most of his adult life. He was convicted in 2013 for being the getaway driver for Dale Cregan, a gangster who had assassinated a gangland rival in a turf war. While on the run Cregan lured two female Greater Manchester police officers to an address in neighbouring borough Tameside, where he cold-bloodedly murdered them by gunning them down and throwing a grenade onto their bodies.

At a full council meeting in 2020, as Deputy Leader of Oldham Council, Shah addressed long-standing rumours about her relationship with Ali, explaining she had known him since she was 11 years old. Shah's relationship with Ali was subject to further criticism when he started a vigilante group to patrol the streets of Oldham in the Chadderton and Werneth areas. Whilst Shah expressed reservations about Ali's plans, she stopped short of condemning them. This prompted a backlash by residents; local community campaigner, Robert Barnes, wrote to the Chief Executive of Oldham Council, Carolyn Wilkins, asking her if she thought it was "acceptable for street patrols to be carried out by a convicted getaway driver and heroin dealer?" Barnes subsequently stood against Shah in the Chadderton South ward as the Conservative candidate at the 2022 Local Eelections, defeating her by 96 votes, leaving Oldham Council searching for a new leader for the second year running.

References 

Living people
Labour Party (UK) councillors
Leaders of local authorities of England
1978 births
Members of the Greater Manchester Combined Authority